MEMOrg is a proprietary software program, owned by the translation company Serious Business, located in Bucharest, Romania. The program is a Computer Assisted Translation (CAT) online tool.

Operation 
MEMOrg uses a database of previous translations stored on a central server to which all users can connect.

Once inside the tool, the user can select the best fit filters (such as domains, references, languages or better qualified translators) for his or her project.

Translation software